Thomas P. Stafford Airport  is a city-owned, public-use airport located two nautical miles (4 km) northeast of the central business district of Weatherford, a city in Custer County, Oklahoma. Named after NASA astronaut and Weatherford native Thomas P. Stafford, it is included in the National Plan of Integrated Airport Systems for 2011–2015, which categorized it as a general aviation facility.

Although many U.S. airports use the same three-letter location identifier for the FAA and IATA, this airport is assigned OJA by the FAA but has no designation from the IATA.

The Stafford Air & Space Museum, which is also named for Thomas P. Stafford, is located at the airport, and exhibits the Gemini 6A space capsule flown by Stafford and Wally Schirra in 1965 and the spacesuit Stafford wore during his 1969 Apollo 10 Moon mission.

Facilities and aircraft 
Thomas P. Stafford Airport covers an area of 167 acres (68 ha) at an elevation of 1,605 feet (489 m) above mean sea level. It has one runway designated 17/35 with a concrete surface measuring 5,100 by 75 feet (1,554 x 23 m). The runway previously had an asphalt surface measuring 4,400 by 75 feet (1,341 x 23 m).

For the 12-month period ending April 19, 2008, the airport had 7,000 general aviation aircraft operations, an average of 19 per day. At that time there were 26 aircraft based at this airport: 85% single-engine, 11% multi-engine, and 4% helicopter.

References

External links 
 Thomas P. Stafford Airport
 Thomas P. Stafford Airport (OJA)  at Oklahoma Aeronautics Commission
 Aerial image as of February 1995 from USGS The National Map
 

Airports in Oklahoma
Buildings and structures in Custer County, Oklahoma
Thomas P. Stafford